Þórhildur Þorleifsdóttir (born 25 March 1945) is an Icelandic theater, opera, film and television director, actress, dancer, choreographer and politician. She was the artistic director of the Reykjavik City Theatre from 1996 to 2000. She was a member of Alþingi from 1987 to 1991, representing The Women's List.

Personal life
Þórhildur was born in Ísafjörður. She is married to Icelandic actor Arnar Jónsson. Their daughter is the Icelandic actress Sólveig Arnarsdóttir.

Þórhildur is the older sister of actor Eggert Þorleifsson.

References

External links

1945 births
Living people
Þórhildur Þorleifsdóttir
Þórhildur Þorleifsdóttir
Þórhildur Þorleifsdóttir
Þórhildur Þorleifsdóttir
Þórhildur Þorleifsdóttir
Þórhildur Þorleifsdóttir
Þórhildur Þorleifsdóttir
Þórhildur Þorleifsdóttir
Women's List politicians